Monsrud Bridge is a historic structure originally located northwest of Waterville, Iowa, United States. The King Iron Bridge Company of Cleveland fabricated and erected the Bowstring pony arch structure in 1887. It was listed on the National Register of Historic Places (NRHP) in 1998.

The bridge was replaced with a low water crossing and abandoned in place. In 2004, it was moved to the Yellow River State Forest. It was removed from the NRHP in 2022.

References

Bridges completed in 1887
Bridges in Allamakee County, Iowa
Arch bridges in Iowa
Tied arch bridges in the United States
National Register of Historic Places in Allamakee County, Iowa
Road bridges on the National Register of Historic Places in Iowa
Former National Register of Historic Places in Iowa